General Sir Charles Carmichael Monro, 1st Baronet,  (15 June 1860 – 7 December 1929) was a British Army General in the First World War. He held the post of Commander-in-Chief, India in 1916–1920. From 1923 to 1929 he was the Governor of Gibraltar.

Early military career
He was the youngest son of Henry Monro and Catherine Power. Educated at Sherborne School and the Royal Military College, Sandhurst, Monro was commissioned into the 2nd Regiment of Foot as a second lieutenant on 13 August 1879. He was promoted to lieutenant on 15 May 1881 and to captain on 24 July 1889.

He attended the Staff College, Camberley from 1889 to 1890 and, promoted to major on 23 February 1898, he served as a brigade major until he was appointed a deputy assistant adjutant general on 15 April 1899. He vacated that appointment in February 1900, as he went to South Africa to serve in the Second Boer War, where he was present at the Battle of Paardeberg in 1900. Promoted to temporary lieutenant-colonel in 1900, he was brevetted to lieutenant-colonel on 29 November 1900. On 28 March 1903, he was promoted to the substantive rank of lieutenant-colonel and appointed commandant of the School of Musketry. Promoted to colonel in 1906, he was appointed Commander of 13th Infantry Brigade in Dublin on 12 May 1907, with the temporary rank of brigadier-general. Promoted to major-general on 31 October 1910, on 31 March 1912 he became General Officer Commanding (GOC) 2nd London Division.

First World War

In the early days of the First World War on 5 August 1914, Monro was deployed to France as General Officer Commanding 2nd Division, which played an important part in the First Battle of Ypres. He led with what a subordinate described as "the gift of personal magnetism". On 27 December 1914 he became General Officer Commanding I Corps, with the temporary rank of lieutenant-general. He was made General Officer Commanding Third Army on 15 July 1915 with the temporary rank of general. He was promoted to the permanent rank of lieutenant-general on 28 October.

In October 1915, the seventh month of the Gallipoli Campaign, General Ian Hamilton was dismissed as Commander-in-Chief of the Mediterranean Expeditionary Force. Charles Monro was sent to evaluate what had been achieved and to recommend the next steps for the campaign. The Allied position had been drastically altered by the entry of Bulgaria into the war and the Central Powers' subsequent swift conquest of Serbia, which opened the railway from Germany to Constantinople for transporting heavy guns and ammunition. After three days conferring and inspecting the three beachheads, Monro cabled Secretary of State for War Herbert Kitchener to recommend evacuating "the mere fringe of the coast-line" that had been secured. Kitchener would not authorize a withdrawal, which was strongly opposed by the Navy, instead, he came to the Middle East to see for himself. After arriving on 9 November 1915 he and Monro toured the fronts, landing on open beaches since there were no ports.  Then they visited the Allied lines in Greek Macedonia, where reinforcements were badly needed. On 17 November 1915 Kitchener agreed to evacuate and put Monro in control as Commander-in-Chief Mediterranean. The architect of the Dardanelles campaign, Winston Churchill, resigned from the government in protest. He later memorably described Monro's stance as "He came, he saw, he capitulated" (a parody of Julius Caesar's line veni, vidi, vici). The War Committee dithered, finally on 7 December agreeing to evacuate two of the bridgeheads (ANZAC Cove and Suvla Bay). Their reluctance was understandable: Ottoman guns were able to strike the landing zones on all three beachheads, so evacuation casualties were estimated at thirty to forty per cent  Monro requested fifty-six hospital ships.  On 19–20 December the two beachheads were evacuated without a single casualty, leaving behind only some spiked artillery and slaughtered mules. It was a masterly display by the commanders of the beachheads and their staff. After further pressure from Monro, the evacuation of the remaining beachhead at Cape Helles was authorized on 28 December with the agreement of the French who had troops there. It was skillfully executed on the night of 8–9 January 1916, again astonishingly without casualties. They had taken off 83,048 men, 4,695 horses and mules, 1,718 vehicles, and 186 heavy guns.

In 1916 Monro briefly commanded the British First Army in France before becoming Commander-in-Chief India later that year. He was a fine choice, because his "Standard was whether a man was an Empire-builder." One of his responsibilities was the campaign in Mesopotamia. On 1 August 1916 British CIGS William Robertson ordered him to "keep up a good show" in Mesopotamia but not to make any further attempts to take Baghdad  this restriction was overruled on the War Committee by Curzon and Chamberlain. On his way to India Monro inspected the forces in Mesopotamia commanded by General Maude. After receiving Monro's favourable report on 18 September 1916 the War Committee authorized Maude to attack. On 1 October 1916, Monro was promoted to the substantive rank of general. Baghdad was taken on 11 March 1917.    In off hours Monro continued to charm with his "whimsical, almost fantastic type of humour."

Later life

In May 1921, Monro was created a Baronet, of Bearcrofts in the Shire of Stirling. In 1923 Monro was appointed Governor of Gibraltar. In 1915, he married Mary O'Hagan, youngest daughter of Thomas O'Hagan, 1st Baron O'Hagan, Lord Chancellor of Ireland, and his second wife Alice Towneley: they had no children. Monro died in 1929, his body being buried at Brompton Cemetery in London.

Honours

British
 Knight Grand Cross of the Order of St. Michael and St. George (GCMG): 1 January 1916
 Knight Grand Cross of the Order of the Bath (GCB): 1 January 1919 (KCB: 18 February 1915; CB: 1906 Birthday Honours)
 Knight Grand Commander of the Order of the Star of India (GCSI): 3 June 1919
 Baronet of Bearcrofts in the Shire of Stirling: 12 May 1921

Others
 Grand Officer of the Legion of Honour of France: 10 September 1915
 Grand Cordon of the Order of the Rising Sun of the Empire of Japan: 17 May 1919

References

Further reading

 Crowley, Patrick. "Loyal to Empire: The Life of General Sir Charles Monro, 1860–1929", Stroud, United Kingdom: The History Press, 2016, 
 Woodward, David R. "Field Marshal Sir William Robertson", Westport Connecticut & London: Praeger, 1998, 
 

|-

|-

|-

|-

|-

|-

|-

|-

1860 births
1929 deaths
People born at sea
Governors of Gibraltar
British Army generals of World War I
Baronets in the Baronetage of the United Kingdom
Knights Grand Cross of the Order of the Bath
Knights Grand Cross of the Order of St Michael and St George
Knights Grand Commander of the Order of the Star of India
Knights of the Order of St John
British Commanders-in-Chief of India
Burials at Brompton Cemetery
Charles Monro, 1st Baronet
People educated at Sherborne School
Queen's Royal Regiment officers
Graduates of the Royal Military College, Sandhurst
British Army personnel of the Second Boer War
Graduates of the Staff College, Camberley
Members of the Council of the Governor General of India
British Army generals